Church of Saints Philip and James is a Roman Catholic church in Vilnius' Old Town, near the Lukiškės Square. It is famous for the Mother of God of Lukiškės painting.

References

 

Roman Catholic churches completed in 1722
18th-century Roman Catholic church buildings in Lithuania
Baroque architecture in Lithuania
Roman Catholic churches in Vilnius
1722 establishments in the Polish–Lithuanian Commonwealth